Généreux was a  74-gun ship of the line of the French Navy.

Career 
Ordered in the late days of the First French Empire, Généreux was not completed before 1831, and then stayed in ordinary for years before finally becoming active in 1839, when she was appointed to Admiral Lalande's squadron in the Atlantic, under Captain Durand. In 1841, she served in the Mediterranean under Captain Graëb.

From 1852, she was used as a prison ship, and served as barracks in Toulon from 1865 before being broken up.

Notes, citations, and references

Notes

Citations

References

Ships of the line of the French Navy
Téméraire-class ships of the line
1831 ships